Tasleem is an Indian politician and a member of the 18th Uttar Pradesh Assembly and was also 17th Uttar Pradesh Assembly and  16th Legislative Assembly member of Uttar Pradesh, India. He represents the Najibabad constituency of Uttar Pradesh and was a member of the Bahujan Samaj Party political party.

Early life and education
Tasleem was born in Bijnor district, Uttar Pradesh. He has received education till twelfth grade. Before being elected as MLA, he used to work as a businessperson.

Political career
Tasleem has been a MLA for two terms. He represents the Najibabad constituency and is a member of the Samajwadi Party.

Posts Held

See also
Najibabad
Uttar Pradesh Legislative Assembly
Government of India
Politics of India
Bahujan Samaj Party

References 

Bahujan Samaj Party politicians from Uttar Pradesh
Uttar Pradesh MLAs 2012–2017
Uttar Pradesh MLAs 2017–2022
People from Bijnor district
1960 births
Living people
Samajwadi Party politicians
Samajwadi Party politicians from Uttar Pradesh